The Purdue Fort Wayne Mastodons baseball team is the varsity intercollegiate baseball program of Purdue University Fort Wayne in Fort Wayne, Indiana, United States. The program's first season was in 1970, and it has been a member of the NCAA Division I Horizon League since the start of the 2021 season. Its home venue is Mastodon Field, located on Purdue Fort Wayne's campus. Doug Schreiber is the team's head coach starting in the 2020 season. The program has appeared in 0 NCAA Tournaments. It has won zero conference tournament championships and 0 regular season conference titles. As of the start of the 2020 Major League Baseball season, 0 former Mastodons have appeared in Major League Baseball.

History

Early history
The program's first season of play was 1970.

Conference affiliations
 Great Lakes Valley Conference (1996–2001)
 Independent (2002–2008)
 Summit League (2009–2020)
 Horizon League (2021–present)

Mastodon Field

The venue has a capacity of 200 spectators.

Prior to the 2011 season, the field's surface and pitcher's mound were renovated. It also features a brick backstop, dugouts, batting cages, and grandstand seating.

Head coaches
Purdue Fort Wayne's longest tenured head coach was Bobby Pierce, who has coached the team from 2009 to 2019. On July 23, 2019, Doug Schreiber was named the team's head coach.

Head coaches records

Notable former players
Below is a list of notable former Mastodons and the seasons in which they played for Purdue Fort Wayne.

 Ryan Steinbach (2004–2005)
 Evan Miller (2015–2016)

See also
 List of NCAA Division I baseball programs

References

External links